NA-156 Vehari-I is a constituency for the National Assembly of Pakistan.

Election 2002 

General elections were held on 10 Oct 2002. Chaudhry Nazir Ahmad Jutt of PML-Q won by 76,217 votes.

Election 2008 

General elections were held on 18 Feb 2008. Chaudhry Nazir Ahmed Jutt of PML-Q won by 65,250 votes.

Election 2013 

General elections were held on 11 May 2013. Chauhary Nazir Ahmed Arain of PML-N won by 99,909 votes and became the  member of National Assembly.

Election 2018 

General elections are scheduled to be held on 25 July 2018.

See also
NA-155 Lodhran-II
NA-157 Vehari-II

References

External links 
Election result's official website

NA-167